Genghis Khan Airlines was an airline headquartered at Hohhot Baita International Airport in Hohhot, the capital of Inner Mongolia, China.

History
The airline was a venture of Inner Mongolia Communications Investment Group with support from the government of the Inner Mongolia Autonomous Region, China. On October 17, 2018, the airline confirmed an order for 25 Comac ARJ21 airplanes. The airplanes were scheduled for delivery in early 2019. The first aircraft was delivered on February 22, 2019. The airline launched its first flights in July 2019 from Hohhot to Ulanhot. 

Genghis Khan Airlines was however placed into liquidation on 22 September 2022.

Destinations 
, Genghis Khan Airlines served the following destinations:

Fleet 

, Genghis Khan Airlines fleet consists of the following aircraft.

References

External links 

Defunct airlines of China
Airlines established in 2017
Airlines disestablished in 2022
Companies based in Hohhot
Transport in Inner Mongolia
2017 establishments in China
2022 disestablishments in China